Ivan Mikhailovich Zirikov (born 6 February 1998) is a Russian football player.

Club career
He made his debut in the Russian Professional Football League for FC Dynamo-2 Moscow on 20 July 2016 in a game against FC Tekstilshchik Ivanovo.

He made his Russian Football National League debut for FC Tekstilshchik Ivanovo on 7 July 2019 in a game against FC Yenisey Krasnoyarsk.

International
He was on the roster of the Russia national under-17 football team for 2015 FIFA U-17 World Cup, but did not play in any games at the tournament.

Personal life
His younger brother Nikolay Zirikov is also a football goalkeeper.

References

External links
 Profile by Russian Professional Football League

1998 births
Footballers from Moscow
Living people
Russian footballers
Russia youth international footballers
Association football goalkeepers
FC Dynamo Moscow reserves players
FC Tekstilshchik Ivanovo players
Russian Second League players
Russian First League players